Antoinette Cini (née Sammut; born 11 June 1993) is a Maltese former footballer who played as a midfielder. She has been a member of the Malta women's national team.

References

1993 births
Living people
Women's association football midfielders
Maltese women's footballers
Malta women's international footballers